Thomas Flohr (born 17 March 1960) is a Swiss businessman, founder and chairman of VistaJet, a private jet charter company, amateur racing driver and former billionaire.

As of March 2018, Forbes estimated his net worth at US$2.3 billion. In March 2019, Flohr had dropped off the billionaires list.

Early life
Flohr was born in Switzerland on 17 March 1960, the son of a teacher. After school he applied unsuccessfully for flight training at Lufthansa. He studied business and political science at Ludwig Maximilian University of Munich.

Career
From 1985 until the early 2000s, Flohr worked for the Chicago-based technology firm Comdisco. He was President of their European division from 1990 to 1994. He was President of Comdisco's worldwide asset finance division from 1995 to 2000. He would later buy out most of Comdisco's European operations through his Swiss-based group Comprendium Investment, which he still controls.

In 2003 he bought his first Bombardier Learjet 60.

In 2016 Flohr, who spends over 800 hours in the air each year, was named Entrepreneur of the Year by The Living Legends of Aviation awards.

He lives in St. Moritz, Switzerland. As a hobby he competes in motorsport, including the East African Safari Rally, Le Mans 24 Hour and the FIA World Endurance Championship; he is also a sponsor to the Scuderia Ferrari team. He collects art, including Jeff Koons, Keith Haring and Sterling Ruby.

Personal life
Flohr was married to Katharina Flohr (née Konečný), formerly creative director of Fabergé and editor of Russian Vogue. They had one daughter together, Nina, who was the former brand director of VistaJet. On 1 September 2020, the former Greek royal family announced the formal engagement of Miss Flohr with Prince Philippos of Greece and Denmark, fifth child and third son of King Constantine II and Queen Anne-Marie of Greece. The couple married in a civil ceremony in Saint-Moritz, Switzerland on 12 December 2020, with Thomas one of only two guests in attendance.

Legal issues
In 2020, the United States Government announced intentions to seize property belonging to Flohr. The $22 million dollar mansion was the subject of scrutiny after its previous owner, an associate of Flohr's, was implicated in a major corruption scandal.

Career results

Complete FIA World Endurance Championship results

* Season still in progress.

Complete 24 Hours of Le Mans results

References

Living people
Swiss billionaires
Swiss racing drivers
FIA World Endurance Championship drivers
European Le Mans Series drivers
Ludwig Maximilian University of Munich alumni
Year of birth uncertain
24 Hours of Le Mans drivers
Former billionaires
1960 births

AF Corse drivers
Le Mans Cup drivers